KM21 is a museum for contemporary visual art in The Hague in the Netherlands. The museum was established in 2002 as part of the Kunstmuseum Den Haag. In KM21 work by artists from The Hague, the Netherlands and international contemporaries can be admired at the same time.

A wide diversity of disciplines is on show: installations, video installations, painting and sculpture, multimedia, performance, film, photography, drawing, digital art, design, etc. In addition to exhibitions, activities such as lectures, discussions, performances, film screenings and book presentations also take place. The museum is located beside the Kunstmuseum Den Haag and also houses the Fotomuseum Den Haag (The Hague Museum of Photography).

History 
KM21 was set up in 2002 by the Kunstmuseum Den Haag under the name Gem, Contemporary Art, shortly GEM, to represent the contemporary visual art department of that museum. It was located in the renovated Schamhart Wing next to the Kunstmuseum, and shares this building with The Hague Museum of Photography. In 2016 the GEM and the Museum of Photography traded placed to give more room to the Museum of Photography.

Exhibitions 
The opening exhibition in 2002 was about the American artist Raymond Pettibon. It offered an "overwhelming amount of drawing... partly framed and partly pinned directly to the wall." It was described as "a sinister body of work, in which serial killers, dictators, baseball players, movie stars and comic book heroes play the leading roles."

In the year 2021 the museum has organized exhibitions of artists such as the South African painter Lisa Brice, the Groningen artist Alida Pott (1888-1931). and the Scottish-born contemporary visual artist Caroline Walker

References

External links
 Official website

Museums in The Hague
Modern art museums
Art museums and galleries in the Netherlands
Art museums established in 2002
2002 establishments in the Netherlands
21st-century architecture in the Netherlands